Admiral Charles Ramsay Drinkwater Bethune CB (27 December 1802 – 14 February 1884) was a British officer of the Royal Navy. He rose to the rank of Admiral during his career.

Early life 

Born at Little Ealing, Middlesex, the son of Colonel John Drinkwater and Eleanor Congalton, he assumed the name of Bethune in 1837, when his mother inherited the estates of her brother, George Congalton-Bethune.

Military career

Bethune served with the Royal Navy from the age of 13 and commanded   in Australasia and the Far East from 1836 to 1842. He reported the Conway Reef in 1838. He served in the First Opium War and was appointed a Companion of the Bath in 1841 for his services.

In 1845 he was sent to Borneo by the Admiralty to report on the best location for a British base against piracy. In the course of this mission he painted a number of watercolour views in Sarawak which were published in 1847 in James Augustus St. John's  Views in the Eastern Archipelago.

In 1846 he joined the Council of the newly formed Hakluyt Society, for which he subsequently edited two volumes. (The first edited volume, written by Sir John Hawkins, was published in 1847, and the second edited volume, written by Antonio Galvano, was published in 1862.) In 1851, on the death in India of his elder brother John Elliot Drinkwater Bethune, he became 24th Laird of Balfour.

He was promoted Admiral 2 April 1866.

He died in 1884 and is buried in Brompton Cemetery, London.

Family
In 1846, he had married Frances Cecilia (1819–1888), only child of Henry Edward Staples, and they had six children. Of his sons, #1 Edward Cecil Bethune (1855–1930) became a Lieutenant-General in the British Army, #2 Henry Leonard Drinkwater Bethune (1858–1939) became a Captain in the Royal Navy, and #3 Francis John Brownlow Bethune (1860–1954) became a King's Counsel in Australia. His eldest daughter, Mary Frances Drinkwater Bethune (1847–1929), in 1867 married John George Frederick Hope-Wallace (1839–1900), son of the Honourable James Hope and his wife Lady Mary Frances Nugent.  Mary Frances Drinkwater Bethune had seven children.

References

External links
 

1802 births
1884 deaths
Royal Navy admirals
Companions of the Order of the Bath
Burials at Brompton Cemetery
Royal Navy personnel of the First Opium War
People from Ealing